The Pedja is the fourth longest river in Estonia. Its source is near Simuna on the southern slopes of the Pandivere Upland. The river flows for 122 km through Lääne-Viru, Jõgeva and Tartu counties before joining the Emajõgi northeast of Lake Võrtsjärv. The last 4 km section of the river after confluence with Põltsamaa is known as the Pede. The largest settlement on the river is Jõgeva.

The Pedja is also the origin of the name of Alam-Pedja Nature Reserve, a large protected area on the river's lower reaches.

References
 Pedja jõgi

External links

Rivers of Estonia
Landforms of Jõgeva County
Landforms of Lääne-Viru County